The 1900 Haskell Indians football team was an American football team that represented the Haskell Indian Institute (now known as Haskell Indian Nations University) as an independent during the 1900 college football season. In its first season under head coach Alfred G. Ellick, Haskell compiled a 9–1 record and shut out six of ten opponents.

Schedule

References

Haskell
Haskell Indian Nations Fighting Indians football seasons
Haskell Indians football